Melissa Lynn Gilliam is an American pediatric and adolescent gynecologist. She is the first woman of color to serve as provost of Ohio State University, having previously served as the Ellen H. Block Distinguished Service Professor of Health Justice at the University of Chicago.

Early life and education
Gilliam was born in Washington, DC to journalist mother Dorothy Butler Gilliam, and artist father Sam Gilliam. Her mother was the first African-American journalist for The Washington Post. She earned her Bachelor's degree in English literature from Yale University, a Master of Arts degree in philosophy and politics from the University of Oxford, a medical degree from Harvard University and a Master of Public Health degree from the University of Illinois Chicago.

Career
Gilliam joined the faculty at the University of Chicago (U of C) in 2005. She eventually became the chief of family planning and contraceptive research and head of the program in gynecology for children, adolescents, and young women at the University of Chicago Medical Center. In this role, her research team followed African American teenage mothers to see how their education, housing, exercise, weight gain, emotional state, and relationships influence their risk of a repeat pregnancy.

As a result of her research, Gilliam was named a Faculty Fellow of the Bucksbaum Institute for Clinical Excellence for the 2013–14 academic year. During this time, Gilliam founded the Center for Interdisciplinary Inquiry and Innovation in Sexual and Reproductive Health (Ci3) that used games, narrative, and design to understand and address the social and structural determinants of adolescent sexual and reproductive health. Within the Ci3, there are three internal laboratories including one for game design, one for storytelling, and one for design thinking. In her Game Changer Chicago Design Lab, she used video games and digital storytelling to discuss sexual violence prevention in a "safe risk taking" manner. She also received a MacArthur Foundation grant to develop a game called A Day in the Life to teach teenagers about HIV, bullying, teen pregnancy, healthy relationships, and intersections between home and school life. Following this, Gilliam was elected to the National Academy of Medicine for being "an authority on contraception and adolescent health."

Following her election to the National Academy of Medicine, Gilliam was appointed the Vice Provost for Academic Leadership, Advancement and Diversity. She was also appointed the Ellen H. Block Professor in Health and Justice. Prior to leaving U of C, Gilliam's professorship was given the Distinguished Service title. In 2021, Gilliam joined the faculty at Ohio State University where she became the first woman of color to serve as provost. In the same year, she joined the Board of Directors at Talis Biomedical.

Personal life
Gilliam and her husband, who is also a doctor, have two children together.

References

External links

Living people
African-American academic administrators
Academics from Washington, D.C.
American gynecologists
Ohio State University faculty
University of Chicago faculty
Yale University alumni
Alumni of the University of Oxford
Harvard Medical School alumni
Members of the National Academy of Medicine
Year of birth missing (living people)
University of Illinois Chicago alumni
African-American women academic administrators